San Benedetto Po is a comune (municipality) in the Province of Mantua in the Italian region Lombardy, located about  southeast of Milan and about  southeast of Mantua. It is best known as the location of the Polirone Abbey.

References

Cities and towns in Lombardy